Eupithecia lineosa is a moth in the  family Geometridae. It is found in India (Kashmir), Nepal and Pakistan.

References

Moths described in 1888
lineosa
Moths of Asia